Pope Theophilus II of Alexandria, was the 60th Pope of Alexandria and Patriarch of the See of St. Mark.

10th-century Coptic Orthodox popes of Alexandria